Catholic Health Initiatives (CHI) was a national Catholic healthcare system, with headquarters in Englewood, Colorado. CHI was a nonprofit, faith-based health system formed, in 1996, through the consolidation of three Catholic health systems. It was one of the United States' largest healthcare systems. In February 2019, CHI merged with Dignity Health, forming CommonSpirit Health.

History

Founding 
CHI began operations in 1996. The founding systems were the Catholic Health Corporation of Omaha, Nebraska, the Franciscan Health System of Aston, Pennsylvania, and the Sisters of Charity Health Care Systems of Cincinnati, Ohio.

Expansion 
In September 1997, the Sisters of Charity of Nazareth Health System in Nazareth, Kentucky consolidated with Catholic Health Initiatives. In March 1998, the Sisters of St. Francis of the Immaculate Heart of Mary in Hankinson, North Dakota transferred sponsorship of a hospital and eight clinics to CHI. In September 2010, Consolidated Health Services, a home care service provider with 30 locations in Kentucky, Ohio, and Indiana, joined CHI. Home health is later re-branded as CHI Health at Home. In May 2013, St. Luke's Episcopal Health System, a six-hospital system based in Houston, Texas, joined CHI as St. Luke's Health System. The organization included outpatient clinics in Houston and affiliations with Baylor College of Medicine, Kelsey-Seybold Clinic, Texas Heart Institute, Texas Children's Hospital, and MD Anderson Cancer Center. On April 1, 2014, Mercy Health of Hot Springs, Arkansas signed a definitive agreement to transfer ownership of Mercy Hot Springs hospital and medical group to CHI St. Vincent. In June 2014, CHI St. Luke's Health Memorial of Lufkin, Texas joined CHI. In October 2014, CHI St. Alexius Health of Bismarck, North Dakota becomes a direct affiliate of CHI, adding St. Alexius Medical Center and two critical access hospitals to the system. In November 2014, Sylvania Franciscan Health becomes part of CHI, adding St. Joseph Health System in the Brazos Valley region of Texas; Franciscan Living Communities in Kentucky and Ohio; and three hospitals in eastern Ohio to the system In January 2016, Brazosport Regional Health System in Lake Jackson, Texas joins CHI St. Luke's Health, Houston. In December 2017, Dignity Health and CHI announce a definitive agreement to merge.

CHI has expanded since 2011, entering new states and expanding in existing ones. CHI also acquired the health insurer QualChoice, but was unsuccessful in its ownership; QualChoice is currently for sale.

2019 merger
In 2018, Dignity Health and Catholic Health Initiatives received a merger approval from the Catholic Church, through the Vatican. Merged on February 1, 2019, as  CommonSpirit Health, the new company formed as the largest Catholic health system, and the second-largest nonprofit hospital chain, in the United States.

In January 2019, the KentuckyOne Health system decided to transition to the legacy of the Sisters of Charity of Nazareth, Lexington's first hospital. Focusing on central and southern Kentucky, it is one of the largest health organizations in the Commonwealth of Kentucky. KentuckyOne Health system hospitals and clinics in the Louisville area was later purchased by the University of Louisville's UofL Health.

Operations
Colorado-based CHI is one of the nation's largest health systems, operating in 18 states and comprising 104 hospitals, including four academic health centers and major teaching hospitals and 30 critical-access facilities; community health-services organizations; accredited nursing colleges; home-health agencies; and other facilities that span the inpatient and outpatient continuum of care.

In fiscal year 2014, CHI provided $910 million in charity care and community benefit - a nearly 20% increase over the previous year - for programs and services for the poor, free clinics, education and research. Charity care and community benefit totaled more than $1.7 billion with the inclusion of the unpaid costs of Medicare. The health system, which generated revenues of almost $3.9 billion (FY 2018), has total assets of $5.1 billion.

Shareholder activism
CHI practices shareholder activism by purchasing shares in publicly-traded corporations and engaging with corporate management on environmental, social and corporate governance issues. Following the 2018 Stoneman Douglas High School shooting, in example; Catholic Health Initiatives was the lead filer, co-filing with the Adrian Dominican Sisters, of a shareholder resolution asking firearms manufacturer Sturm, Ruger & Co. to report to investors regarding the steps they are taking to reduce gun violence. Ruger opposed the resolution. BlackRock, the world's largest asset manager and Ruger's largest investor, as well as Institutional Shareholder Services and Glass Lewis, the two most important shareholder advisory firms in the United States, supported the resolution. At Ruger's annual meeting on May 9, 2018, 69 percent of shareholders voted in favor and Ruger agreed to heed the resolution. The Brady Campaign to Prevent Gun Violence called the vote a "first-of-its-kind victory."

Controversy
In January 2013, the hospital's defense lawyers provoked controversy when they defended against a wrongful death lawsuit by arguing that unborn fetuses should not be classed as persons.  This contradicted Catholic doctrine established by Pope John Paul II. When the case was submitted to the three bishops of Colorado for review, they issued a joint statement which reiterated their commitment to defending human dignity against attacks.

Divisions
Arkansas Hospitals (CHI St. Vincent)
CHI St. Vincent Infirmary, Little Rock, Arkansas
CHI St. Vincent Hot Springs, Hot Springs, Arkansas
CHI St. Vincent Morrilton, Morrilton, Arkansas
CHI St. Vincent North, Sherwood, Arkansas
Centura Health, Englewood, Colorado (partnership with AdventHealth)
MercyOne, Des Moines, Iowa (partnership with Trinity Health)
Kentucky Hospitals (formerly KentuckyOne Health, now CHI Saint Joseph Health). VNA Health at Home and Amerimed locations are also part of Saint Joseph Health
CHI Saint Joseph Hospital, Lexington, Kentucky
CHI Saint Joseph East, Lexington, Kentucky (formerly Jewish Hospital Lexington)
Continuing Care Hospital, Lexington, Kentucky
CHI Saint Joseph Health - Women's Hospital, Lexington, KY
CHI Saint Joseph Hospital, Berea, Kentucky (formerly Berea Hospital)
CHI Saint Joseph Hospital, London, Kentucky (formerly Marymount – Our Lady of the Mountain)
CHI Saint Joseph Martin, Martin, Kentucky
CHI Saint Joseph Mount Sterling, Mount Sterling, KY (formerly Mary Chiles Hospital)
Flaget Memorial Hospital, Bardstown, KY
Minnesota Hospitals
CHI LakeWood Health, Baudette, Minnesota
CHI St. Francis Health, Breckenridge, Minnesota
CHI St. Joseph's Health, Park Rapids, Minnesota
CHI St. Gabriel's Health, Little Falls, Minnesota
Nebraska & Iowa Hospitals (CHI Health)
CHI Health Creighton University Medical Center Bergan Mercy, Omaha, Nebraska
CHI Health Good Samaritan, Kearney, Nebraska
CHI Health Immanuel Medical Center, Omaha, Nebraska
CHI Health Lakeside, Omaha, Nebraska
CHI Health Mercy, Corning, Iowa
CHI Health Mercy, Council Bluffs, Iowa
CHI Health Midlands, Papillion, Nebraska
CHI Health, Missouri Valley, Iowa
CHI Health Nebraska Heart, Lincoln, Nebraska
CHI Health Saint Elizabeth Regional Medical Center, Lincoln, Nebraska
CHI Health Saint Francis Medical Center, Grand Island, Nebraska
CHI Health Saint Mary's, Nebraska City, Nebraska
Saint Clare's Health System, Denville, New Jersey
North Dakota
CHI Lisbon Health
CHI Mercy Health
CHI Oakes Hospital
CHI St. Alexius Health
Premier Health Partners, Dayton, Ohio (partnership)
TriHealth, Cincinnati, Ohio (partnership with Bethesda Inc.)
Oregon hospitals
CHI Mercy Health
CHI St. Anthony Hospital
CHI St. Joseph Children's Health (Pennsylvania)
CHI Memorial, Chattanooga, Tennessee
Texas hospitals
CHI St. Joseph Health
CHI St. Luke's Health
Baylor St. Luke's Medical Center, Houston, Texas
Washington hospitals: Virginia Mason Franciscan Health (2021 merger of Virginia Mason and CHI Franciscan)
Virginia Mason Medical Center
St. Anne Hospital
St. Anthony Hospital
St. Clare Hospital
St. Elizabeth Hospital
St. Francis Hospital
St Joseph Medical Center
St. Michael Medical Center
CHI Franciscan Rehabilitation Hospital
Wellfound Behavioral Health Hospital

See also
 CHI Health Center Omaha, an indoor arena in Omaha named through a sponsorship deal with this company's CHI Health subsidiary

References

External links
Official website
Catholic Health Initiatives About Us page

Arapahoe County, Colorado
Charities based in Colorado
Christian charities based in the United States
Hospitals established in 1996
Hospital networks in the United States
Catholic health care
Catholic charities
Religious corporations
Medical and health organizations based in Colorado
Catholic hospital networks in the United States